Vertebra is a framework that aims to simplify writing applications in The Cloud written by Engine Yard.

Release 
It was released under the GNU Lesser General Public License 3 at the end of 2008.

Technologies 
Vertebra is written in a combination of Ruby and Erlang.

Public reception 
It has been characterized as a Service-Oriented-Architecture for the cloud, an application deployment platform, and an evolution in the architecture for cloud computing.  For its part, Engine Yard simply classifies it as "A Platform for the Cloud."

References

External links 
 
 Support site

Cloud platforms
Beta software